Delgerkhaan is a sum (district) of Khentii Province in Eastern Mongolia. Avraga Toson resort is 4 km west of the Delgerkhaan sum center. Kherlenbayan-Ulaan settlement is 38 km west of the Delgerkhaan sum center. In 2010, its population was 2,040.

References 

Districts of Khentii Province